Radical 46 or radical mountain meaning "mountain" is one of the 31 Kangxi radicals (214 radicals total) composed of three strokes. It is found in the names of mountains generally in east Asia.

In the Kangxi Dictionary, there are 636 characters (out of 49,030) to be found under this radical.

 is also the 39th indexing component in the Table of Indexing Chinese Character Components predominantly adopted by Simplified Chinese dictionaries published in mainland China.

In Taoist cosmology, 山 (mountain) is the nature component of the bagua diagram  gèn. This diagram corresponds to the I Ching trigram ☶.

Evolution

Literature

See also
仙
List of mountains in China
List of mountains in Japan
List of mountains in Korea

External links

Unihan Database - U+5C71

046
039